Ivan Maroslavac  (born 24 June 1976) is a Croatian retired footballer who played for NK Vinogradar in the Croatian Second League.

Club career
Maroslavac previously played for HNK Cibalia and NK Rijeka in the Croatian First League. He also had a spell in the Israeli Premier League with Bnei Yehuda during the 2003–04 and 2004–05 seasons.

References

1976 births
Living people
Sportspeople from Vinkovci
Association football midfielders
Croatian footballers
HNK Cibalia players
HNK Rijeka players
NK Vinogradar players
Bnei Yehuda Tel Aviv F.C. players
Croatian Football League players
First Football League (Croatia) players
Israeli Premier League players
Croatian expatriate footballers
Expatriate footballers in Israel
Croatian expatriate sportspeople in Israel